Nehru Place is a large commercial center in Delhi, India. Although its importance as a financial center has declined in recent years, Nehru Place is still a prominent commercial area in South Delhi and houses the headquarters of several Indian firms and rivals with other financial centers in the metropolis like Connaught Place, Bhikaji Cama Place and Rajendra Place.

It had been listed as a notorious market in 2009 and 2010 by the USTR for selling counterfeit software, media and goods.

Location and accessibility
Nehru Place is accessible by all forms of public transport, as it lies next to the Outer Ring Road, an arc that encompasses major parts of South Delhi. In addition, bus services are very frequent, usually once every five to eight minutes. Private taxis are also available, as well as paid parking for cars and motorcycles. The famous Lotus Temple of the Baháʼí Faith is also located close by. Now Nehru place is accessible by Delhi Metro. The nearest metro stations include Nehru Place, Kalkaji Mandir and Nehru Enclave.

 Has its own Delhi-Metro Station on Violet Line (Kashmere Gate to Raja Nahar Singh)
 Has a second Metro Station by the name of Nehru Enclave on Magenta Line (Botanical garden-Janakpuri West) connecting commuters with a short route from Gurgaon with an interchange at Hauz Khas, and directly connecting Noida and IGI Airport.
 30 minutes from Hazrat Nizamuddin Railway Station
 1 hr from New Delhi Railway Station
 It has its own bus terminal, popularly known as Nehru Place Bus Terminal.

Areas near Nehru Place
 Delhi
 Nehru Enclave
 Shaheen Bagh
 East of Kailash
 Greater Kailash
 Sarita Vihar
 Kailash Colony
 Okhla
 Kalkaji
 Govindpuri
 Jasola Vihar
 Chittaranjan Park
 Sant Nagar
 Malviya Nagar
 Madanpur khadar
 NehruPlaceDealers

Nearby spiritual places
 Kalka Mandir
 Lotus Temple
 Prachin Bhairav Mandir
 ISKCON Temple Delhi

See also
List of things named after Jawaharlal Nehru
 Market Place of Nehru Place Delhi

References

District Centres of Delhi
New Delhi
Shopping districts and streets in India
South Delhi district
Monuments and memorials to Jawaharlal Nehru
Notorious markets